Each Man's Son is the fourth novel by Canadian writer Hugh MacLennan. First published in 1951 by Macmillan of Canada, it takes place in a coal mining town on Cape Breton, Nova Scotia just before the First World War.

Plot summary
Mollie MacNeil and her son Alan, miss Archie (Mollie's husband) who is away in the United States trying to make a living as a professional boxer. Archie has been away for four years and it is not clear whether he will return at all. He is adamant that he will never go and work in the coal mines. Meanwhile, Louis Camire, a French expatriate, is trying to convince Mollie to come with him to France where people are more equal than those in the company-owned mining town.

The company doctor, Daniel Ainslie, takes a liking to young Alan, since his own wife Margaret is unable to bear children herself. Margaret was made barren by her own husband, who had to perform a procedure on her. Ainslie tries to exert his influence on Mollie and Alan. Daniel believes that Alan has the intelligence to escape the mining town. Mollie and Margaret share their fears about Daniel's influence and contrive to blunt it.

After much soul-searching, Daniel realizes that he cannot both have Alan like a son and his wife Margaret at the same time. This contradiction is violently resolved in the book's conclusion.

References

1951 Canadian novels
Novels by Hugh MacLennan
New Canadian Library
Novels set in Nova Scotia